Sinon station is a railway station of the Korean State Railway in Sinol-li, Taegwan County, North P'yŏngan Province, North Korea, on P'yŏngbuk Line of the Korean State Railway. It is also the starting point of the Taegwalli Line, which serves a private station for the Workers' Party of Korea elite.

History
Sinon station, originally called Ch'angp'yŏng station, was opened along with the rest of the line by the Pyongbuk Railway on 27 September 1939.

References

Railway stations in North Korea